Church of the Name of the Virgin Mary is a Roman Catholic church in Křtiny, South Moravian Region, Czech Republic. It is an important pilgrimage destination in Moravia and one of the most celebrated shrines in Central Europe.

The church was designed by the famous architect Jan Santini Aichel and it was one of the last commissioned by him. It is an iconic masterpiece of so-called radical Baroque of Bohemia and Moravia, built as part of a complex of monastic buildings and summer residences of the Premonstratensian Zábrdovice Abbey, an order dedicated to the preaching and the exercising of pastoral ministry. Santini received the commission in 1711, under the patronage of bishop of Olomouc Maxmilian Hamilton and abbot Hugo Bartlicius, whose palace was behind in the slope. The temple was constructed in time of the rule of abbot Krištof Matuška.

Gallery

References

Further reading
 Young, Michael. Santini-Aichel'S Design for the Baroque Convent at the Cistercian... New York: Columbia University Press, 1994.
 Kavička, Karel. Poutní a farní chrám Páně Jména Panny Marie ve Křtinách wit English Summary: Pilgrimageand Parish Temple of the name of The Blessed Virgin Mary in Křtiny. Brno, Kartuziánské nakladatelství 2014.
 Krsek, Ivo; Kudělka, Zdeněk; Stehlík, Miloš; Válka, Josef, Umění Baroka na Moravě a ve Slezsku (English abstract: Society and Baroque culture in Moravia p. 695). Prague, Academia 1996. 
 Royt, Jan; Horyna, Mojmír; Hylík, Vladimír. Křtiny – Poutní kostel Jména Panny Marie. Historická společnost Starý Velehrad 1994
 Kalina, Pavel. In opere gotico unicus: The Hybrid Architecture of Jan Blazej Santini-Aichel and Patterns of Memory in Post-Reformation Bohemia.Praha: UMENI-ART 58.1 (2010): 42-+.
 Horyna, Mojmír, J. B. Santini-Aichel – Život a dílo. Karolinum, Praha 1998,

External links

PEŃÁZ, Jan, Křtiny for foreigners - English
Santini tour - English
Křtiny u Brna
Fotografie kostnice pod chrámem Jména Panny Marie ve Křtinách

Basilica churches in the Czech Republic
Blansko District
Jan Santini Aichel buildings
Baroque church buildings in the Czech Republic
Catholic pilgrimage sites
Church buildings with domes
National Cultural Monuments of the Czech Republic
Roman Catholic churches completed in 1771
18th-century Roman Catholic church buildings in the Czech Republic